Ahenakew is a Cree surname. Notable people with the surname include:

 Freda Ahenakew (1932–2011), Canadian anthropologist
 David Ahenakew (1933–2010), Assembly of First Nations chief

Anglicized Cree-language surnames